The La Bisbal Ceramic School it's a school in Catalonia (Girona Spain), that offers diverse courses in ceramics, sculpture, drawing, painting, glass, woodworking, metalworking, restoration, jewellery and other arts and crafts.

Nowadays consecrated artists, like Alfonso Otero Regal, João Carqueijeiro, Fernando Porto Mato, Rafaela Pareja Ribera, Heitor Figueiredo or Joan Panisello, had graduated in this school.

External links
 Link to the official website of the La Bisbal Ceramic School

Art schools in Spain
Schools in Catalonia
Girona